1984 JSL Cup Final was the ninth final of the JSL Cup competition. The final was played at Komazawa Olympic Park Stadium in Tokyo on April 15, 1984. Yanmar Diesel won the championship.

Overview
Defending champion Yanmar Diesel won their 3rd title, by defeating Toshiba 3–0. Yanmar Diesel won the title for 2 years in a row.

Match details

See also
1984 JSL Cup

References

JSL Cup
1984 in Japanese football
Cerezo Osaka matches
Hokkaido Consadole Sapporo matches